Badri Khasaia (born September 24, 1979) is an amateur Georgian Greco-Roman wrestler, who played for the men's light heavyweight category. He won a silver medal for his division at the 2002 World Wrestling Championships in Moscow, Russia, and bronze at the 2007 World Wrestling Championships in Baku, Azerbaijan. He also added two more medals to his collection from the European Championships (2005 in Varna, Bulgaria, and 2008 in Tampere, Finland). Khasaia is a member of the wrestling team for Dynamo Tbilisi, and is coached and trained by Damerlan Davidaia.

Khasaia represented Georgia at the 2008 Summer Olympics, where he competed for the men's 84 kg class. He received a bye for the second preliminary round, before losing out to Turkish wrestler and three-time Olympian Nazmi Avluca, who was able to score five points in two straight periods, leaving Khasaia with a single point.

References

External links
Profile – International Wrestling Database
NBC 2008 Olympics profile

Male sport wrestlers from Georgia (country)
1979 births
Living people
Olympic wrestlers of Georgia (country)
Wrestlers at the 2008 Summer Olympics
World Wrestling Championships medalists
European Wrestling Championships medalists